/b/ (also called random) is one of the boards of 4chan. /b/ was the first board created at the establishment of the platform in 2003, and it then stood for "anime/random". While /b/ permits discussion and posting of any sort of content, the community etiquette is to self-limit discussion on /b/ of those topics which are specialties or the focus of other boards on 4chan. /b/ is the most popular imageboard on 4chan, next to /pol/ (politically incorrect). Due to its popularity and notorious content, it overshadows the website with a bad reputation. 

/b/ is one of a handful of key online spaces from which the hacktivist group Anonymous originated.

In 2014, The Washington Post described /b/ as "an unfathomable grab-bag of the random, the gross and the downright bizarre".

Analysis
A 2011 Massachusetts Institute of Technology analysis examined two weeks of posts to /b/ in summer 2010. During this time, users made 5.5 million posts on /b/ in 480,000 threads. The median life of a discussion thread was four minutes; the longest in that period was six hours. The analysis found that the community mostly posts playful images and links. The same analysis found that at least 90% of the posts are anonymous, though posters do adopt and discard various claims of identity at will.

A 2013 article noted that 4chan is a top-ranking website by popularity, especially in the United States, but also globally. Within 4chan, /b/ was the most popular and active board as of 2013.

Character
/b/ and /pol/ are the most notorious boards on 4chan.

One of /b/'s defining features is its lack of posting rules. In general, anything that does not go against US law will not be removed. /b/ is consequently one of the only boards on 4chan where users can post grotesque and objectionable material such as gore and hate speech.

/b/ is among the boards on 4chan which has a not safe for work (NSFW) designation. Consequently, users may post NSFW content on /b/ when the 4chan moderators may restrict such postings on boards without that designation.

The community at /b/ sustains various customs. Users may promise to post photos of acts of self-degradation in an attempt to barter. A 2013 research paper reported that misogyny sustains the culture at /b/.
 
Users sometimes claim to have insider information on news events,  ask for advice, often on romance and relationships, or post various images containing puzzles.

/b/'s history, the absence of any substantial regulation or enforcement of rules and the users' anonymity have all been considered as essential variables that have contributed to a culture of ambiguity that serves to confound attempts to assess the verisimilitude of that which is posted to the board. One scholar summarized the unique challenges presented by the cultural context of /b/ by observing that "it is impossible to truly discern posters’ views due to their anonymity and the saturation of 4chan’s discourse with self-referential irony and a refusal to accept anything at face-value".

Events

In October 2006, a /b/ user was arrested for threatening to bomb multiple National Football League stadiums. He was sentenced to six months in prison and a further six months in house arrest.

In 2008, /b/ users spread a rumour that Apple's (at the time) CEO, Steve Jobs, had suffered a fatal heart attack; The rumour's impact on shareholder's confidence resulted in a drop in Apple's share price by approximately $10USD.

Through a combination of repeat voting and manipulation of the site’s servers, /b/ users successfully altered the outcome of Time magazine’s 2009 “world’s most influential people” poll so that 4chan's founder, Christopher Poole, was represented in the publication as the world's most influential person.

In January 2012 when the United States Department of Justice took down Megaupload, Anonymous retaliated by hacking various websites including that of the Department of Justice and the Federal Bureau of Investigation. During the attacks /b/ hosted live narration of the event with early information about how to watch various websites go down.

4chan hosts various live discussion events related to crimes and persuading people to mistakenly and foolishly destroy their iPhones.

Development
In the year 2009, /b/ accounted for 30% of traffic on 4chan, which had 44 image boards at the time.

In response to community demand to expel "social posts" on /b/, in 2011 Moot established /soc/, the social board of 4chan.

See also
 Sarah Palin email hack
 4chan

References

Further reading

External links
 

4chan
Online obscenity controversies
Internet properties established in 2003